Camas is a municipality located in the province of Seville, Andalusia,  Spain. According to the 2006 census (INE), the city has a population of 25,706.

Notable people 

Sergio Ramos, professional footballer
 Rafael Núñez Florencio, historian, philosopher, and critic

References

External links

Camas - Sistema de Información Multiterritorial de Andalucía